Thái Bình is a coastal eastern province in the Red River Delta region of northern Vietnam. Its name is Sino-Vietnamese (太平) for "great peace." It is about 18 km from Nam Định, 70 km from Haiphong, and 110 km from Hanoi.

Administrative divisions
Thái Bình is subdivided into eight district-level sub-divisions:

 7 districts:

 Đông Hưng
 Hưng Hà
 Kiến Xương
 Quỳnh Phụ
 Thái Thụy
 Tiền Hải
 Vũ Thư

 1 provincial city:
 Thái Bình (capital)

They are further subdivided into nine commune-level towns (or townlets), 267 communes, and 10 wards.

People and culture
Although situated in the centre of the Red River Delta, in the past, Thái Bình was considered an island bounded by three larger rivers, and is the only province never to have been merged or separated. This position gives the people of Thái Bình a quite distinct culture. Thái Bình is the homeland of hát chèo opera (in Khuốc village, Phong Châu commune, Đông Hưng District) and water puppetry (in Nguyên Xá commune, Đông Hưng District).  Thái Bình people are noted for their practical and clever character.

Thái Bình is the homeland of the most prolific and famous Vietnamese savant in the Middle Ages: Lê Quý Đôn. Trần Thủ Độ, the founder of the Trần dynasty, was born in Hưng Hà District. Bùi Viện, the founder of Haiphong city, was a famous reformer in the 19th century. He was the first Vietnamese known to have visited the United States and also served as ambassador to the United States under the Nguyễn dynasty.

The first Vietnamese to travel into outer space was the cosmonaut Phạm Tuân, a native of Thái Bình. Two other natives of Thái Bình are the ones who finalized the two famous wars in Vietnam: Tạ Quốc Luật, who captured Christian de Castries and raised the victory flag in the Battle of Dien Bien Phu (the First Indochina War) and Bùi Quang Thận, who led a group of Northern tanks and entered the headquarters of South Vietnam's government to make president Dương Văn Minh unconditionally surrender (the second Indochina War). The Thái Bình born, first Chief of General Staff was Hoàng Văn Thái. Thái Bình is also the homeland of several famous Vietnamese political dissidents and humanitarians. Thích Quảng Độ is a Vietnamese Buddhist leader and critic of the Vietnamese government. In 2006, he was awarded the Thorolf Rafto Memorial Prize, and was also a nominee for the Nobel Peace Prize. Dương Thu Hương, arguably the most famous postwar Vietnamese writer, whose novel Paradise of the Blind (Những thiên đường mù, 1988) became the first Vietnamese novel ever published in the United States in English, is also a famous political dissident. Nguyễn Hữu Đang, born in Kiến Xương District, was the leader and prominent victim of the Nhân Văn affair – a movement for a movement for political and cultural freedom of Vietnamese intellectuals. This affair is one of the most tragic events in modern Vietnamese history.

Some Thái Bình people are among the richest in Vietnam, including Vũ Quang Hội who is the founder of Bitexco group (who owns Bitexco Financial Tower in Ho Chi Minh City, The Manor luxury building in Hanoi, etc.), Vu Van Tien, founder of Geleximco – the largest private company in Hanoi and AB Bank, a large private bank. Quách Tuấn Ngọc, a native of Đông Hưng, while a professor of computer science in Hanoi University of Technology, authored the first successfully commercial domestic software: BKED (Bach khoa Editor) – a system for processing Vietnamese text, in the 1980s.

Etymology
The province's name derives from Sino-Vietnamese 太平 meaning "great peace".

See also
 Đồng Xâm a silvercraft village in the northern province of Thái Bình's Kien Xuong District

References

External links
Official Site of Thai Binh Government

 
Provinces of Vietnam